Chak Beli Khan is a town and union council of Rawalpindi District, Punjab, Pakistan central to a large population. It is located in the Pothohar Plateau near the Soan River. It has a large marketplace. It is one of the largest towns in Rawalpindi District.

Chak Beli Khan is the commercial hub of all the surrounding areas which includes more than 110 villages. Chak Beli Khan is business center of area belongs to PP10 (Rawalpindi), as well as the largest area in terms of population as per the 2017 census. It contains all the basic necessities of life.

Location and geography
Chak Beli Khan is located in the Pothohar Plateau near the Soan River.

Education
There are a number of government educational institutions being developed in the town, such as
 Govt. Elementary School Chak Beli Khan for boys.
 Govt. High School Chak Beli Khan for boys.
Govt. Degree College Chak Beli Khan for boys.
 Govt. Girls Primary School Chak Beli Khan for girls.
 Govt. Elementary School Chak Beli Khan for girls.
 Govt. Girls Higher Secondary School Chak Beli Khan.
 Govt. Associate Degree College Chak Beli Khan for girls.

Some private English Medium schools are also there in the town. Students from nearby villages come and study in these schools.

Health Facilities
Chak Beli Khan has one main Govt. Primary Healthcare Center. Private  clinics and healthcare units are also working in the town. Lady health workers are also working with other Govt. Basic Health Units in the area.

Major projects related to health 
Jorian Hospital Chak Beli Khan: There was no major hospital in Chak Beli Khan for a long time but now a government hospital is being built in Jorian Chak Beli Khan which will have 100 beds. There is some work left in the building. Once the building is completed, its finishing work will begin.
Shaykh-Ul-Alam Hospital Chak Beli Khan: private hospital where construction started on 7  January 2022.

Languages
Punjabi is the main language of Chak Beli Khan, other languages are Urdu Pothohari, and rarely spoken language Pashto.

Telecommunication
The PTCL provides the main network of landline telephone. Many ISPs and all major mobile phone, Wireless companies operating in Pakistan provide service in Chak Beli Khan.

Banks Branches
There are many  branches of different banks in Chak Beli Khan, which provides excellent service to people of Chak Beli Khan and  nearby villages. The names of the branches are as follows.
Muslim Commercial Bank (MCB) Branch Chak Beli Khan 
Habib Bank Limited (HBL) Branch Chak Beli Khan 
United Bank Limited (UBL) Branch Chak Beli Khan 
Askari Bank Branch Chak Beli Khan

Oil and Gas Resources
Chak Beli Khan has oil and gas reserves. Oil and gas fields are drilled at Pindori Chak Beli Khan and a good amount of oil and gas is extracted, yet the people of Chak Beli Khan remained without gas for many years, but know gas was provided to the people of Chak Beli Khan.

References 

Towns in Rawalpindi District
Union councils of Rawalpindi District
Union councils of Rawalpindi Tehsil